Search for the Truth may refer to:

 Search for the Truth (film), a 2007 anti-Mormon film
 Search for the Truth, a 2002 EP by Protest the Hero

See also
 The Search for Truth, a 1962 film produced by The Church of Jesus Christ of Latter-day Saints